Konig's Westphalian Gin was a Steinhäger gin produced up to the early part of the twentieth century from mineral water at H. C. König's "model distillery" in Steinhagen, Westphalia, Germany, said at the time to be the largest and the oldest gin distillery in the world. The gin was first produced in 1640.

Background
By an edict of 1688, the "Great Elector" Frederick William of Brandenburg, in his capacity as Count of Ravensberg, granted the inhabitants of Steinhagen the exclusive privilege to distil alcohol and the area is still known for its Steinhäger gins (wacholder), distilled from crushed, fermented, juniper berries from the bushes of that plant that grow on the slopes of the nearby Teutoburg Forest. In the nineteenth century around twenty companies produced the spirit. Only gins distilled near Steinhagen can legally be called Steinhäger gins.

Marketing
Since Konig's gin was much like other Steinhäger gins, it sought to differentiate itself from its competitors through exaggerated advertising slogans.

The gin claimed unlikely medicinal benefits under the slogan, "The Spirit that rejuvenates". Other such slogans included "The only perfect gin", "The Royal Liqueur" and "The Royal Appetiser & Digestive". Its advertising included the obviously spurious claim that it was "highly recommended by all doctors against kidney, bladder and stomach troubles and especially for cholera, malaria and typhus".

In common with other contemporary gins, König's was sold in tall stoneware (steingut) bottles, and Konig's was given a red seal in an attempt to make it distinctive. The gin was widely advertised in yearbooks of the period such as The Stage Year Book and the Royal Colonial Institute Year Book and in magazines like The English Illustrated Magazine.

Konig's gin has been marketed in Germany as "Steinhäger-Urquell" ("urquell" translates as "original source" or "wellspring", as with the beer Pilsner Urquell), in an effort to establish a claim as the original and authentic Steinhäger gin.

Claim of Royal warrant
The firm's advertising said that the gin was supplied to the British House of Commons and House of Lords, and it claimed that the firm held a royal warrant of appointment.

Claim of awards
König boasted that the spirit had over 250 Grand Prix and gold medals from trade fairs. The company's gins and liqueurs were shown at the World's Columbian Exposition (The Chicago World's Fair) of 1893.

H.C. König
The firm's British wholesaler was located at Beer Lane, London E.C. The firm "HC König" is now part of Mozart Distillerie GmbH in Salzburg, Austria, and produces and distributes spirits and liqueurs. Harald König is the Chief Executive and President.

See also

 König Brauerei (a different firm)
 List of gin brands

References

External links
Antique German Salt Glaze Stoneware Gin Bottle HC Konig
Konig bottles of Germany and Austria at Miniature Bottle Library.
Types of Gin: Steinhäger

Gins
German distilled drinks
British Royal Warrant holders
1640 establishments in the Holy Roman Empire